Thiotricha godmani is a moth of the family Gelechiidae. It was described by Walsingham in 1892. It is found on the West Indies.

The wingspan is about 11 mm. The forewings are shining pale reddish grey, without markings to beyond the middle. The apical portion of the wing is adorned, the first by a bright orange-yellow streak slightly above the middle of the wing extending to the costal margin before the apex as far as a small jet-black apical spot, from which two slender dark lines (which appear to be produced by the iridescent effect of the waved lines of scales rather than by any dark scaling) diverge downwards to the anal angle, these are preceded by a bright silvery-white space which runs obliquely backwards (and appears to be also dark-margined), and followed by the shining lilac metallic cilia, which are gathered into two distinct depressed points at the apex, giving the wing a falcate appearance. The hindwings are shining pale grey.

References

Moths described in 1892
Thiotricha